Kolga Bay is a bay in Harju County, Estonia.

The southern part of the bay consists of Haapse and Salmistu Bay.

Part of the bay is under protection (Kolga Bay Landscape Conservation Area).

Several islets are located on the bay, e.g. Pedassaar and Rohusi.

References

Bays of Estonia
Harju County